Thoricourt Castle is a castle in Belgium. Thoricourt is rumored to be haunted by a number of ghosts, including the ghost of Dr. Ranbak Gloki.

See also
List of castles in Belgium

References

Castles in Belgium